Wallace Wesley LaViolette (4 Jan 1894 Saint James, Minnesota - 29 Jul 1978 Escondido, California) was an American musician who composed, conducted, lectured, and wrote about music.  He was also a poet and music theorist.  As an educator, he mentored Shorty Rogers, Jimmy Giuffre, John Graas, George Perle, Florence Price, Bob Carter, Bob Florence and Robert Erickson and writer William Irwin Thompson.  Laviolette was an important figure on the West coast jazz scene of the 1950s.

Career 
LaViolette received his undergraduate degree in music from Northwestern University in 1917. He earned three graduate degrees. From 1923 to 1933, LaViolette was dean of the Chicago Musical College. He served as director for DePaul University School of Music from 1933 until 1938. In 1930 he received the David Bispham Medal Award for his opera Falstaff (or possibly Shylock.)

In the 1950s LaViolette was the teacher for many writers and players associated with the West Coast jazz scene. LaViolette supported their work, calling them "America's musical contribution to tomorrow ... I don't always LIKE what they do - but I respect it."

Selected compositions 
 Largo Lyrico, string quartet (1941)
 Prelude and Aria, symphonic work (1941); premiered by the Cincinnati Symphony Orchestra November 14 and 15, 1941   
 Autumn, from Songs of love, a song cycle based on Chopin compositions, for high voice, piano, and orchestra; music: Alexander Laszlo, words: Wesley LaViolette (1954)
 Irridescence, from Songs of love, a song cycle based on Chopin compositions, for high voice, piano, and orchestra; music: Alexander Laszlo, words: Wesley LaViolette (1954)
 Lilac time, from Songs of love, a song cycle based on Chopin compositions, for high voice, piano, and orchestra; music: Alexander Laszlo, words: Wesley LaViolette (1954)
 Love laughed, from Songs of love, a song cycle based on Chopin compositions, for high voice, piano, and orchestra; music: Alexander Laszlo, words: Wesley LaViolette (1954)
 The Wayfarer: An Interpretation of the Dhammapada, published by DeVores & Co. (1956)
 Charade, for four flutes (1946)
 Sonata, for flute and piano (1946)

Collections 
 The LaViolette Collection — which included his own recordings, books, scores, photographs and personal papers — is archived at The Los Angeles Jazz Institute, California State University, Long Beach.
 The original manuscript of LaViolette's First Symphony (1935) is housed at the Library of Congress, Washington, D.C.

Career positions 
 Professor of Music Composition, DePaul University, Chicago
 Professor of Music Composition, American Conservatory of Music, Chicago
 Professor of Music Composition, Thornton School of Music, University of Southern California, Los Angeles

References 
General references
 The ASCAP Biographical Dictionary, Third edition. New York: American Society of Composers, Authors and Publishers, 1966
 Baker's Biographical Dictionary of Musicians, Sixth edition. Revised by Nicolas Slonimsky. London: Collier Macmillan Publishers
 Biographical Dictionary of American Music, by Charles Eugene Claghorn. West Nyack, NY: Parker Publishing Co., 1973
 Biography Index. A cumulative index to biographical material in books and magazines. Volume 1: January 1946 to July 1949, New York: H.W. Wilson Co., 1949
 Contemporary American Composers, A biographical dictionary, First edition. Compiled by E. Ruth Anderson. Boston: G.K. Hall & Co., 1976
 Who Was Who among English and European Authors, 1931-1949, based on entries which first appeared in The Author's and Writer's Who's Who and Reference Guide, originally compiled by Edward Martell and L.G. Pine, and in Who's Who among Living Authors of Older Nations, originally compiled by Alberta Lawrence. Three volumes. Detroit: Gale Research, 1978
 Who's Who in America, 38th edition, 1974-1975. Wilmette, IL: Marquis Who's Who, 1974
 Who's Who in America, 39th edition, 1976-1977. Wilmette, IL: Marquis Who's Who, 1976
 Who's Who in America, 40th edition, 1978-1979. Wilmette, IL: Marquis Who's Who, 1978
 Who's Who in Music and Musicians' International Directory, Sixth edition. New York: Hafner Publishing Co., 1972. Later editions published as International Who's Who in Music and Musicians' Directory
 Who's Who in the West, 15th edition, 1976-1977. Wilmette, IL: Marquis Who's Who, 1976
 The Blue Book, Leaders of the English-speaking world, 1976 edition. New York: St. Martin's Press, 1976

Inline citations

1894 births
1978 deaths
USC Thornton School of Music faculty
People from St. James, Minnesota
American male classical composers
American classical composers
20th-century classical composers
DePaul University faculty
American Conservatory of Music faculty
20th-century American composers
Classical musicians from Minnesota
20th-century American male musicians